Chili peppers (also chile, chile pepper, chilli pepper, or chilli), from Nahuatl chīlli, are varieties of the berry-fruit of plants from the genus Capsicum, which are members of the nightshade family Solanaceae, cultivated for their pungency. Chili peppers are widely used in many cuisines as a spice to add "heat" to dishes. Capsaicin and related compounds known as capsaicinoids are the substances giving chili peppers their intensity when ingested or applied topically. While chili peppers are (to varying degrees) pungent or "spicy", there are other varieties of capsicum such as bell peppers, which generally provide additional sweetness and flavor to a meal rather than "heat."

Chili peppers are believed to have originated somewhere in Central or South America. and were first cultivated in Mexico. After the Columbian Exchange, many cultivars of chili pepper spread around the world, used for both food and traditional medicine. This led to a wide variety of cultivars, including the annuum species, with its glabriusculum variety and New Mexico cultivar group, and the species of baccatum, chinense, frutescens, and pubescens.

Cultivars grown in North America and Europe are believed to all derive from Capsicum annuum, and have white, yellow, red or purple to black fruits. In 2019, the world's production of raw green chili peppers amounted to 38 million tons, with China producing half.

History

Origins 
Capsicum plants originated in modern-day Bolivia and have been a part of human diets since about 7,500 BC. They are one of the oldest cultivated crops in the Americas. Origins of cultivating chili peppers have been traced to east-central Mexico some 6,000 years ago, although, according to research by the New York Botanical Garden press in 2014, chili plants were first cultivated independently across different locations in the Americas including highland Bolivia, central Mexico, and the Amazon. They were one of the first self-pollinating crops cultivated in Mexico, Central America, and parts of South America.

Peru has the highest variety of cultivated Capsicum diversity because it is a center of diversification where varieties of all five domesticates were introduced, grown, and consumed in pre-Columbian times. The largest diversity of wild Capsicum peppers is consumed in Bolivia. Bolivian consumers distinguish two basic forms: ulupicas, species with small round fruits including C. eximium, C. cardenasii, C. eshbaughii, and C. caballeroi landraces; and arivivis with small elongated fruits including C. baccatum var. baccatum and C. chacoense varieties.

Distribution to Europe 
When Christopher Columbus and his crew reached the Caribbean, they were the first Europeans to encounter Capsicum. They called them "peppers" because, like black pepper of the genus Piper known in Europe, they have a spicy, hot taste unlike other foods.

Distribution to Asia 
Chili peppers spread to Asia through their introduction by Portuguese traders, who—aware of their trade value and resemblance to the spiciness of black pepper—promoted their commerce in the Asian spice trade routes. They were introduced in India by the Portuguese towards the end of the 16th century. In 21st-century Asian cuisine, chili peppers are commonly used across many regions.

Production

In 2020, 36 million tonnes of green chili peppers were produced worldwide, with China producing 46% of the total.

Species and cultivars 

There are five domesticated species of chili peppers:
 Capsicum annuum includes many common varieties such as bell peppers, wax, cayenne, jalapeños, Thai peppers, chiltepin, and all forms of New Mexico chile. 
 Capsicum frutescens includes malagueta, tabasco, piri piri, and Malawian Kambuzi. 
 Capsicum chinense includes the hottest peppers such as the naga, habanero, Datil and Scotch bonnet.
 Capsicum pubescens includes the South American rocoto peppers. 
 Capsicum baccatum includes the South American aji peppers.

Though there are only a few commonly used species, there are many cultivars and methods of preparing chili peppers that have different names for culinary use. Green and red bell peppers, for example, are the same cultivar of C. annuum. Unripe peppers are green (although peppers that do not turn red on ripening have been bred). In the same species are the jalapeño, the poblano (which, when dried, is referred to as ancho), New Mexico, serrano, and other cultivars.

Peppers are commonly broken down into two groupings: bell peppers (UK: sweet peppers) and hot peppers. Most popular pepper varieties are seen as falling into one of these categories or a cross between them.

Intensity 

The substances that give chili peppers their pungency (spicy heat) when ingested or applied topically are capsaicin (8-methyl-N-vanillyl-6-nonenamide) and several related chemicals, collectively called capsaicinoids. The quantity of capsaicin varies by variety, and on growing conditions. Water-stressed peppers usually produce stronger pods. When a habanero plant is stressed, by absorbing low water for example, the concentration of capsaicin increases in some parts of the fruit.

When peppers are consumed by mammals such as humans, capsaicin binds with pain receptors in the mouth and throat, potentially evoking pain via spinal relays to the brainstem and thalamus where heat and discomfort are perceived. However, birds are unable to perceive the hotness and so they can eat some of the hottest peppers. The intensity of the "heat" of chili peppers is commonly reported in Scoville heat units (SHU), invented by American pharmacist Wilbur Scoville in 1912. Historically, it was a measure of the dilution of an amount of chili extract added to sugar syrup before its heat becomes undetectable to a panel of tasters; the more it has to be diluted to be undetectable, the more powerful the variety, and therefore the higher the rating. The modern method is a quantitative analysis of SHU using high-performance liquid chromatography (HPLC) to directly measure the capsaicinoid content of a chili pepper variety. Pure capsaicin is a hydrophobic, colorless, odorless, and crystalline-to-waxy solid at room temperature, and measures 16,000,000 SHU.

Capsaicin is produced by the plant as a defense against mammalian predators and microbes, in particular a fusarium fungus carried by hemipteran insects that attack certain species of chili peppers, according to one study. Peppers increased the quantity of capsaicin in proportion to the damage caused by fungal predation on the plant's seeds.

Common peppers

A wide range of intensity is found in commonly used peppers:

Notable hot chili peppers 
The top 8 world's hottest chili peppers (by country) are:

NOTE: SHU claims marked with an asterisk (*) have not been confirmed by Guinness World Records.

Uses

Culinary uses 

Chili pepper pods are technically berries. When used fresh, they are most often prepared and eaten like a vegetable. Whole pods can be dried and then crushed or ground into chili powder that is used as a spice or seasoning. Chilies can be dried to prolong their shelf life. Chili peppers can also be preserved by brining, immersing the pods in oil, or by pickling.

Many fresh chilies such as poblano have a tough outer skin that does not break down on cooking. Chilies are sometimes used whole or in large slices, by roasting, or other means of blistering or charring the skin, so as not to entirely cook the flesh beneath. When cooled, the skins will usually slip off easily.

The leaves of every species of Capsicum are edible. Though almost all other Solanaceous crops have toxins in their leaves, chili peppers do not. The leaves, which are mildly bitter and nowhere near as hot as the fruit, are cooked as greens in Filipino cuisine, where they are called dahon ng sili (literally "chili leaves"). They are used in the chicken soup tinola. In Korean cuisine, the leaves may be used in kimchi. In Japanese cuisine, the leaves are cooked as greens, and also cooked in tsukudani style for preservation.

Many Mexican dishes, including variations on chiles rellenos, use the entire chili. Dried whole chilies may be reconstituted before grinding to a paste. The chipotle is the smoked, dried, ripe jalapeño. In the northern Mexican states of Sinaloa and Sonora, chiltepin peppers (a wild pepper) are used in cheeses and soups to add spiciness to dishes. In southern Mexico, mole sauce is made with dried chiles, such as ancho and chipotle peppers. Chiles are used in salsas. Mexican households usually grow chile plants to use in cooking.

In India, most households always keep a stock of fresh hot green chilies at hand, and use them to flavor most curries and dry dishes. It is typically lightly fried with oil in the initial stages of preparation of the dish. Some states in India, such as Rajasthan, make entire dishes only by using spices and chilies.

Chili is a staple fruit in Bhutan. Bhutanese call this crop ema (in Dzongkha) or solo (in Sharchop). The ema datshi recipe is entirely made of chili mixed with local cheese.

Chilies are present in many cuisines. Some notable chili-forward dishes other than the ones mentioned elsewhere in this article include arrabbiata sauce, paprikash, chiles en nogada, jerk chicken, mole poblano, nam phrik, 'nduja, sambal, and som tam.

Fresh or dried chilies are often used to make hot sauce, a liquid condiment—usually bottled when commercially available—that adds spice to other dishes. Hot sauces are found in many cuisines including harissa from North Africa, chili oil from China (known as rāyu in Japan), and sriracha from Thailand. Dried chilies are also used to infuse cooking oil.

Ornamental plants 
The contrast in color and appearance makes chili plants interesting to some as a purely decorative garden plant. 
 Black pearl pepper: small cherry-shaped fruits and dark brown to black leaves 
 Black Hungarian pepper: green foliage, highlighted by purple veins and purple flowers, jalapeño-shaped fruits
 Bishop's crown pepper, Christmas bell pepper: named for its distinct three-sided shape resembling a red bishop's crown or a red Christmas bell

Psychology 
Psychologist Paul Rozin suggests that eating chilies is an example of a "constrained risk" like riding a roller coaster, in which extreme sensations like pain and fear can be enjoyed because individuals know that these sensations are not actually harmful. This method lets people experience extreme feelings without any significant risk of bodily harm.

Topical use and health research 
Capsaicin, the pungent chemical in chili peppers, is used as an analgesic in topical ointments, nasal sprays, and dermal patches to relieve pain. A 2022 review of preliminary research indicated that regular consumption of chili peppers was associated with weak evidence for a lower risk of death from cardiovascular diseases and cancer.

Chemical irritants 

Capsaicin extracted from chilies is used in pepper sprays and some tear gas formulations as a chemical irritant, for use as less-lethal weapons for control of unruly individuals or crowds. Such products have considerable potential for misuse, and may cause injury or death.

Crop defense 
Conflicts between farmers and elephants have long been widespread in African and Asian countries, where elephants nightly destroy crops, raid grain houses, and sometimes kill people. Farmers have found the use of chilies effective in crop defense against elephants. Elephants do not like capsaicin. Because the elephants have a large and sensitive olfactory and nasal system, the smell of the chili causes them discomfort and deters them from feeding on the crops. By planting a few rows of the fruit around valuable crops, farmers create a buffer zone through which the elephants are reluctant to pass. Chili dung bombs are also used for this purpose. They are bricks made of mixing dung and chili, and are burned, creating a noxious smoke that keeps hungry elephants out of farmers' fields. This can lessen dangerous physical confrontation between people and elephants.

Food defense 

Birds do not have the same sensitivity to capsaicin, because it targets a specific pain receptor in mammals. Chili peppers are eaten by birds living in the chili peppers' natural range, possibly contributing to seed dispersal and evolution of the protective capsaicin in chili peppers, as a bird in flight can spread the seeds further away from the parent plant after they pass through its digestive system than any land or tree dwelling mammal could do so under the same circumstances, thus reducing competition for resources.

Nutritional value 

Red hot chili peppers are 88% water, 9% carbohydrates, 2% protein, and 0.4% fat (table). In a 100 gram reference amount, chili peppers supply 40 calories, and are a rich source of vitamin C and vitamin B6 (table).

Spelling and usage 
The three primary spellings are chili, chile and chilli, all of which are recognized by dictionaries.
 Chili is widely used in English of the United States and Canada. However, it is also commonly used as a short name for chili con carne (literally "chili with meat"), most versions of which are seasoned with chili powder, which in turn can refer to pure dried, ground chili peppers, or to a mixture containing other spices.
 Chile is the most common Spanish spelling in Mexico and several other Latin American countries, as well as some parts of the United States and Canada, which refers specifically to this plant and its fruit. In the Southwest United States (particularly New Mexico), chile also denotes a thick, spicy, un-vinegared sauce made from this fruit, available in red and green varieties, and served over the local food, while chili denotes the meat dish. The plural is chile or chiles.
 Chilli was the original Romanization of the Náhuatl language word for the fruit (chilli) and is the preferred British spelling according to the Oxford English Dictionary, although it also lists chile and chili as variants. Chilli (and its plural chillies) is the most common spelling in India, Sri Lanka, Australia, Malaysia, New Zealand, Pakistan, Singapore and South Africa.
The name of the plant is unrelated to that of Chile, the country, which has an uncertain etymology perhaps relating to local place names. Certain Spanish-speaking countries in South America and the Caribbean, including Chile, Colombia, Ecuador, Panama, Peru, Dominican Republic, Venezuela and Puerto Rico, call the peppers as ají, a word of Taíno origin.

Though pepper originally referred to the genus Piper, not Capsicum, the latter usage is included in English dictionaries, including the Oxford English Dictionary and Merriam-Webster. The word pepper is also commonly used in the botanical and culinary fields in the names of different types of pungent plants and their fruits.

Safety
The volatile oil in spicy peppers may cause skin irritation, requiring handwashing and care when touching the eyes or any sensitive body parts. Consuming hot peppers may cause stomach pain, hyperventilation, sweating, vomiting, and symptoms possibly requiring hospitalization.

Gallery

See also 

 Chili grenade, a type of weapon made with chili peppers
 Hatch, New Mexico, known as the "Chile Capital of the World"
 History of chocolate, which the Maya drank with ground chili peppers
 International Connoisseurs of Green and Red Chile, organization for the promotion of chili peppers
 Peppersoup
 Ristra, an arrangement of dried chili pepper pods
 Salsa (sauce)
 Sweet chili sauce, a condiment for adding a sweet, mild heat taste to food
 Food and drink prohibitions, which in some cultures includes chili peppers

References

Further reading

External links 

 Plant Cultures: Chilli pepper botany, history and uses
 The Chile Pepper Institute of New Mexico State University
 Capsicums: Innovative Uses of an Ancient Crop
 Chilli: La especia del Nuevo Mundo (Article from Germán Octavio López Riquelme about biology, nutrition, culture and medical topics. In Spanish)
The Hot Pepper List List of chili pepper varieties ordered by heat rating in Scoville Heat Units (SHU)

Agriculture in Mesoamerica
 
Medicinal plants of Central America
Medicinal plants of South America
Crops originating from Ecuador
Crops originating from Mexico
Crops originating from Peru
Symbols of New Mexico
Leaf vegetables
New Mexican cuisine
Cuisine of the Southwestern United States
Crops originating from the Americas
Indian spices
Crops
Sri Lankan spices
Mesoamerican cuisine
Mexican cuisine
Fruits originating in North America